Cornufer gigas, commonly known as the Bougainville sticky-toed frog, is a species of frog in the family Ceratobatrachidae.
It is endemic to Papua New Guinea.

Its natural habitats are subtropical or tropical moist lowland forests and subtropical or tropical moist montane forests.

References

gigas
Amphibians of Papua New Guinea
Taxonomy articles created by Polbot
Amphibians described in 1970